Gao Kexiang is a Chinese diplomat. He was Ambassador of the People's Republic of China to Guinea (2001–2003), Portugal (2006–2010), and Angola (2011–2015).

References

Ambassadors of China to Guinea
Ambassadors of China to Portugal
Ambassadors of China to Angola
Living people
Year of birth missing (living people)
Ambassadors of China to Guinea-Bissau